Marcelo Mayer  (born December 12, 2002) is an American professional baseball shortstop in the Boston Red Sox organization. He was selected by the Red Sox fourth overall in the first round of the 2021 Major League Baseball draft.

Amateur career
Mayer attended Eastlake High School in Chula Vista, California. He became Eastlake's varsity starting shortstop as a freshman in 2018. He committed to play college baseball at the University of Southern California after his freshman year. As a sophomore in 2019, he batted .261 alongside pitching to a 2.00 earned run average (ERA) over five appearances. In 2020, his junior season, he hit .294 with three home runs, six runs batted in (RBIs), and two doubles before the season was cancelled due to the COVID-19 pandemic. That summer, he played in the Perfect Game All-American Classic. 

As a senior in 2021, Mayer batted .392 with 14 home runs and 45 RBIs. In his final high school at bat, he hit a grand slam. He was named the Collegiate Baseball National High School Player of the Year. He was also named Mr. Baseball California State Player of the Year for the 2021 season by Cal-Hi Sports.

Professional career 
Mayer was selected by the Boston Red Sox in the first round of the 2021 Major League Baseball draft with the fourth overall selection. It was the Red Sox' highest draft pick in over 50 years. A number of analysts had Mayer ranked as the top overall prospect in the draft and had described him as a five-tool player. The pick gave the Red Sox a signing bonus allotment of $6,664,000. Mayer officially signed with Boston on July 22, for the assigned slot price of $6.66 million. Mayer reported to the club’s spring training base at Fort Myers, Florida, soon after signing. He made his professional debut for the Florida Complex League Red Sox on August 5, drawing three walks. His first two professional home runs came in back-to-back games in the second half of August. Mayer finished his first professional season with 91 at-bats in which he hit .275 with three home runs and 17 RBIs.

Mayer was assigned to the Salem Red Sox to open the 2022 season. In May 2022, he was ranked 14th in the list of baseball's top 100 prospects by Baseball America. In early August, he was promoted to the Greenville Drive. Over 91 games between both teams, he slashed .280/.399/.489 with 13 home runs, 53 RBIs, and 30 doubles along with going 17-for-17 in stolen base attempts. In January 2023, he was ranked 10th in the Baseball America list of top 100 prospects.

Personal life
Mayer became the third player from Eastlake High School to be selected in the first round of an MLB draft, joining Adrian Gonzalez (2000) and Keoni Cavaco (2019). Mayer grew up a fan of the New York Yankees. He has listed Corey Seager, Francisco Lindor, and Fernando Tatís Jr. as players he admires. Mayer has also listed Derek Jeter as an inspiration for the way he carried himself on and off the field as well as his love for winning.

Mayer was raised in Chula Vista, and also has roots in Ambos Nogales where Mayer's family members have played baseball on both sides of the border. His parents, Enrique and Myriam Mayer, were both born in Nogales Municipality, Sonora, Mexico, and Mayer is also related to Hector "Chero" Mayer who played in the minor leagues with St. Louis Cardinals in the 1950s.

References

Further reading

External links

Profile at MaxPreps
Guide at MLB

2002 births
Living people
Sportspeople from Chula Vista, California
Baseball players from California
Baseball shortstops
Florida Complex League Red Sox players
Salem Red Sox players
Greenville Drive players